Superbrothers is a video game, illustration, and design studio based in Quebec, Canada, most known for their work with Capybara Games and Jim Guthrie on the 2011 iOS release Superbrothers: Sword & Sworcery EP. Superbrothers contributed artwork and concepts to Sound Shapes (2012) by Queasy Games, a videogame for PlayStation 3, PlayStation Vita, and PlayStation 4.

Games developed

Awards
Independent Games Festival - Superbrothers: Sword & Sworcery EP for Achievement In Art, Mobile Category 2010 
Canadian Video Game Awards - Superbrothers: Sword & Sworcery EP for Best Game on the Go, Best Downloadable Game, Best Indie Game, Best Original Music, and Innovation Award 2012 
Game Developers Choice Awards - Superbrothers: Sword & Sworcery EP for Best Handheld/Mobile Game 2012

References

External links
Official site

Privately held companies of Canada
Video game companies of Canada
Video game development companies
Video game companies established in 2003
Canadian companies established in 2003
2003 establishments in Quebec
Companies based in Quebec